Genelec Oy is a manufacturer of active loudspeaker systems based in Iisalmi, Finland. It designs and produces products especially for professional studio recording, mixing and mastering applications, broadcast, and movie production. The company was co-founded by the late Ilpo Martikainen (1947–2017) and Topi Partanen in 1978.

History

Early history 

Genelec began operations to meet the needs of Finland's national public-broadcasting company YLE. YLE was building a new radio house in Pasila, Helsinki. Juhani Borenius, who worked for YLE as an acoustician, asked his friends at a postgraduate acoustics seminar if they could make an active monitoring speaker. Ilpo Martikainen and Topi Partanen had the first sample in two weeks. The prototype was promising enough to raise serious interest. In 1978, after two years of research and development, the company opened for business with their first speaker, the S30. The company moved immediately from Helsinki to Iisalmi, in the center of Finland. The first facilities were in Satamakatu,  in the basement of an apartment building where Martikainen lived.

The first order went to RAI in Italy, the second to YLE in Finland. Four people worked for the company at the time, so YLE's order for 340 pieces gave work for one year. It also gave one year's time to explore other options to keep the company running. The company also began providing sound reinforcement contracting services.

Sound reinforcement contracting was half of the business. Genelec installed systems in many drama theatres in Finland—including the National Theatre, city theatres in Rovaniemi and Kuopio, the congress hall of the new cardiologic hospital in Moscow, the Moscow Circus, and two recording vans for YLE. The last contract job was Tampere Hall and the last audio system supplied went to the Royal Opera in Madrid.

The decision to quit the sound reinforcement business in 1989 was crucial for the future of Genelec. There was no financial need to leave contracting, but the company wanted to be known as a manufacturer.

There was high demand for Genelec speakers from the beginning, and production quantities grew every year, as did the number of employees. In 1981 Genelec delivered active monitors to ZDF’s new control rooms in Mainz. The facilities in Satamakatu became far too small. By 1981 the company had spread across different locations and searched for either a new factory or a lot where they could build one. In 1983, the town offered a lot next to lake Porovesi at Luuniemi. The company has expanded their facilities four times since then.  In addition to production areas, the last expansion adds more room for training and quality listening.

International business 

Genelec has exported speakers from their beginning, and has increased exports over the years. In 1980, they exported 20% of production, in 1984 80%, and on into the 1990s exports peaked at 95% but have settled to around 90% in the 2000s. The first export countries were Italy, the Nordic countries, Federal Republic of Germany, the Netherlands, Austria, and Great Britain. Cooperation with Otaritec Corp. in Japan began in 1986. In 1993, Genelec had distributors in 45 countries, and now has sales in more than 70 countries.

As the export trade has grown, the degree of domestic added value of the products has remained around 80%. The 77th AES convention in Hamburg in 1985 was a turning point for Genelec. They introduced the 1022A and displayed a whole family of speakers: Biamp 1019A mini monitor, broadcasting monitors S30 and 1022A, and music monitors 1024B and 1025A. By 1985, Genelec produced 12 models. They also made sound reinforcement and passive Hi-Fi speakers for the domestic market. The passive Biway 1050A and Triway 1051A were in production in 1980–1982 and production of the small 1049A
began in 1988. They have long since discontinued production of passive hi-fi speakers.

In the 1990s, Genelec was increasingly known as a manufacturer of active monitoring speakers. They designed new products, notably the large control Room Monitors 1035A, 1034A and 1033A between 1988 and 1990. In 1991 Genelec designed the 1031A, which was inducted into the TECnology Hall of Fame in 2014. Genelec followed the 1031A with the 1030A, 1032A, 1029A, 1037A, and 1038A, and subwoofers 1091A, 1092A and 1094A.

21st century 
The first years of the 21st century presented challenges. Genelec introduced the LSE-series of subwoofers and replaced most of the 2-way series with the new 8000 Series. The 8000 Series comprises four models (8020B, 8030A, 8040A and 8050A 2-way Active Loudspeakers), some of which are clearly smaller than their predecessors, which was obtained by using aluminium as the material of the speaker enclosures instead of traditional MDF. Renowned Finnish industrial designer Harri Koskinen designed the 8000 Series' appearance. Adding to the series are the smallest 6010A 2-way loudspeaker and its supporting 5040A Active Subwoofer, introduced in 2008.

Many new Genelec products feature digital signal processing and software control. The 8200 DSP series adds three products to the line (8240A, 8250A 2-way and 8260A 3-way Active Loudspeakers) with ability to automatically adapt their performance to any acoustical conditions with AutoCal calibration through the GLM Software.

As of 2010, Genelec produced over 50 active loudspeaker models, and numerous modifications and versions of these for specific applications. They also produced software products for acoustic calibration. After finishing sound reinforcement contracting, Genelec concentrated solely on active speakers.

Products

Current products 

Studio Monitors
Classic Studio Monitors and Subwoofers
8000 Series: 8010A, 8020D, 8030C, 8040B, 8050B
7000 Series Subwoofers: 7040A, 7050C
™ Compact Studio Monitors
8000 Series: 8320A, 8330A, 8340A, 8350A
Audio over IP Series: 8430A IP
1000 Series: 1032C
SAM™ Coaxial Studio Monitors
The Ones: 8331A, 8341A, 8351B, 8361A
W371A Adaptive Woofer System
SAM™ Master Studio Monitors
1237A, 1238A, 1238AC, 1238DF, 1234A, 1234AC, 1235A, 1236A
S360A
SAM™ Studio Subwoofers
7350A, 7360A, 7370A, 7380A, 7382A

Home Speakers
G Series Active Speakers
G One (B)
G Two (B)
G Three (B)
G Four (A)
G Five (A)
F Series Active Subwoofers
F One (B)
F Two (B)
Signature Series
6040R

AV Installation Speakers
4000 Series Installation Speakers
4010A Installation Speaker
4020C Installation Speaker
4030C Installation Speaker
4040A Installation Speaker
Architectural Speaker Series
AIC25 Active In-Ceiling Speaker
AIW25 Active In-Wall Speaker
AIW26B Active In-Wall Speaker
5041A Active In-Wall Subwoofer
Smart IP Installation Speakers
4420A Smart IP Installation Speaker
4430A Smart IP Installation Speaker

Retired products 
Limited-production models are not included. Models shown in bold in the "Replaced by" column are in production .

Studio Monitors

Home Speakers

AV Installation Speakers

See also 
 List of studio monitor manufacturers

Notes 
a. The networked SAM™ (Smart Active Monitor) DSP systems feature automatic calibration to the environment.

b. The passive hi-fi speakers, Biway 1050A and Triway 1051A, were in production only for the domestic market in 1980–1982 and the production of the small Biway 1049A began in 1988. Production of passive hi-fi speakers has since been discontinued and the company has concentrated solely on active loudspeakers.

References

External links 
 

Loudspeaker manufacturers
Manufacturers of professional audio equipment
Audio amplifier manufacturers
Audio equipment manufacturers of Finland
Finnish brands
Iisalmi
Manufacturing companies established in 1978